Trần Thị Thủy Tiên (born 25 November 1985), professionally known as Thủy Tiên, is a Vietnamese singer-songwriter, model, actress and philanthropist. Referred to as the “Queen of the Vietnamese Movie Soundtrack”, she is known for her soundtrack albums Giấc Mơ Tuyết Trắng, Đẹp Từng Centiment, and Ngôi Nhà Hạnh Phúc.

Thủy Tiên is married to retired Vietnamese footballer Lê Công Vinh.

Discography
 Ngọt và đắng (2005)
 Thủy Tiên (2006)
 Giấc mơ tuyết trắng (2007)
 Ngôi nhà hạnh phúc (2009)
 Em đã quên (2010)
 Vẫn mãi yêu anh (2012)
 Dẫu chỉ là mơ (2014)
 Đôi mắt người xưa - Bolero (2017)

Filmography

Film

Television

References

Living people
21st-century Vietnamese women singers
1985 births